Rhaphiptera oculata is a species of beetle in the family Cerambycidae. It was described by Gounelle in 1908. It is known from Argentina and Brazil.

References

oculata
Beetles described in 1908